Alexander Day or Alex Day may be:
Alexander Day (con artist), fl. 1720s, British sharper
Alexander Day (artist), 1751–1841, British artist and art collector
Alex Day, b. 1989, British musician